Rohr, Switzerland may refer to:

Rohr, Aargau (Rohr AG)
Rohr, Solothurn (Rohr SO)